Charles Philippe may refer to:

 Charles-Amédée-Philippe van Loo (1719–1795), a French painter of allegorical scenes and portraits
 Prince Charles Philippe, Duke of Anjou (born 1973), Duke of Anjou
 Prince Ferdinand Philippe, Duke of Orléans (1810–1842), Prince Royal of France